The 1969 Atlantic Coast Conference men's basketball tournament was held in Charlotte, North Carolina, at the original Charlotte Coliseum from March 6–8, 1969. North Carolina defeated Duke, 85–74, to win the championship. Charlie Scott of North Carolina was named tournament MVP.

Bracket

References

Tournament
ACC men's basketball tournament
College sports in North Carolina
Basketball competitions in Charlotte, North Carolina
ACC men's basketball tournament